Sangji University (상지대학교) is a private university located in Wonju, Gangwon Province, South Korea. Established in 1955, it has seven colleges and six graduate schools. Its top areas of study are Oriental Medicine (one of only 11 in the country) and Tourism. The Sangji Foundation also manages Sangji Yeongseo College and Sangji Girls Middle and High Schools.

Location
The scenic campus is located on a hill in Woosan-dong and offers a wonderful view of Mt. Chiak. Many students commute to Sangji University from Seoul, which is less than two hours away.

Facilities
Since 2007, the university has offered an English Cafe on campus for students to practice English.
The university is focused on environmentally friendly heating and cooling systems.

Notable alumni
 Chun Jung-myung
 Kang Full 
 Kim Hee-chul (Super Junior)
 Kim Jung-Joo
Yumi Heo

See also
List of colleges and universities in South Korea
Education in South Korea

References

Private universities and colleges in South Korea
1974 establishments in South Korea
Educational institutions established in 1974